Stockport by-election may refer to one of several parliamentary by-elections held for the British House of Commons constituency of Stockport in Cheshire, including:

1920 Stockport by-election
1925 Stockport by-election

See also

Stockport (UK Parliament constituency)